Mitsuyoshi (written: 三厳, 光亮, 光慶, 光美, 光聖 or 猛修) is a masculine Japanese given name. Notable people with the name include:

, Japanese samurai
, Japanese actor
, Japanese manga artist
, Japanese samurai
, Japanese politician
, Japanese mathematician

Mitsuyoshi (written: 光吉) is also a Japanese surname. Notable people with the surname include:

, Japanese video game composer

Japanese-language surnames
Japanese masculine given names